Karnataka Northern Diocese is one among the twenty-two dioceses of the Church of South India which covers the churches in the northern part of Karnataka state.

History of the Diocese

Protestantism spread here mainly through the activities of the Basel Missionaries who came from Germany around 1836.

About
The diocese has the preview of 12 districts in Karnataka state consisting of Bellary, Bijapur, Chitradurga, Dharwad, Shimoga, Uttar Kannada, Haveri, Davangeri, Gadag, Koppal and Bagalkot . The diocese has 85 churches under its administration. The headquarters of the Karnataka Northern Diocese is at Dharwad.

List of bishops
Erstwhile Mysore Diocese 
 Premaka Gurushantha (1947-1951) 
 Norman C. Sargant (1951-1971)
Karnataka Northern Diocese
 1970–1980, William Karl,
 1981-, Vasant P. Dandin,
 Paul Balmi,
 Prabhakara Rao,
 2012-, Ravikumar Niranjan (2012–2021)
 Dr Martin C Borgai

Notable Churches under the Diocese

Abraham Church, Anand Nagar Church, Hubli

Established on 1988, this church is among the most diverse churches in Hubli. Mainly it serves the citizens of Anandnagr, Manjunathnagar, Old Hubli, JP Nagar, and other adjacent areas.

Located right next to Anandnagar bus stand and have access to basic amenities and can accommodate over 150 worshipers.

Holy Name Cathedral, Hubli

In 1919, A L Bradbury was posted to India to preach and train the backward community as well as prisoners as per the orders of Mr Start. Accordingly, Bradbury came to Hubli and started holding religious meetings. In 1925, Bradbury decided to build a church in Ghantikeri area. The foundation for this church was laid by Remington in 1928, who named it as ‘Holy Name’. Bradbury took the help of prisoners in constructing the church. The new church was inaugurated on 7 August 1928 by Wilson.
The church was declared as Holy Name Cathedral on 1 May 1970 and included in Karnataka Northern Diocese. This church has a distinction of having ordained the first Indian bishop William Karl on 25 April 1971.

All Saints Church, Dharwad
 
The All Saints Church located on Dharwad Halyal Road is one of the oldest churches in Dharwad, about 20 km from Hubli. This Anglican church was constructed in the year 1888 in European style of architecture.

CSI EL-Bethel Church Hosur Hubballi
The church was established in 1998. Residents of areas such as Hosur, Vikas Nagar, Siddlingeshwar Park, Rajdhani colony attend services here.

Educational Institutions under Diocese
Basel Mission Higher Education centre and Basel Mission Primary Education Centre which runs 22 educational institutions comes under Karnataka Northern Diocese.
Degree Colleges -4
Junior Colleges-2 
High Schools -7
Eng. Med. Schools -3 
Primary Schools -16
Teachers Training College-1

See also
Church of South India
Central Karnataka Diocese
Church of North India

References

External links
Official website

Northern Karnataka
Christianity in Karnataka